Richard Alan Ackland  is an Australian journalist, publisher and lawyer, who has won many awards for his reporting.

Ackland graduated with degrees in economics and law in the early 1970s and was admitted as a solicitor of the Supreme Court of New South Wales before going on to pursue a career in journalism.

Career 
Ackland initially worked in the financial press and was appointed the Canberra correspondent for the Australian Financial Review during the 1970s. 

In 1986, he founded his law publishing company, Law Press of Australia, and since then has continued to be the publisher of two important Australian legal journals, Justinian and the Gazette of Law and Journalism. 

Moving to the Australian Broadcasting Corporation (ABC) in the 1980s, Ackland was appointed the host of Late Night Live on ABC Radio National. Subsequently he was host of the ABC Radio National breakfast program, Daybreak. From 1998 to 1999, Ackland was the presenter of the ABC-TV show Media Watch. During this time he was awarded a Gold Walkley together with colleagues Deborah Richards and Anne Connolly for their expose of the notorious cash for comment affair.   

Ackland was the legal columnist for Fairfax Media and edited and published the online journal Justinian. Ackland stopped being employed as a regular columnist by Fairfax in June 2014 to write for The Saturday Paper. As of July 2014, Ackland is employed as the Legal Editor at Large at Guardian Australia.

In 2016 he was appointed a Member of the Order of Australia for significant service to the print and television media industries, particularly through reporting on legal issues, and as a publisher.

In September 2016 he was awarded a Doctor of Letters (honoris causa) by Macquarie University.

References

External links 
Justinian
Law Press of Australia
Fairfax press law column
Richard Ackland at saxton..com

Australian television presenters
Year of birth missing (living people)
Living people
Place of birth missing (living people)
Members of the Order of Australia
Walkley Award winners